Edinburgh was a burgh constituency represented in the Parliament of Scotland and the Convention of the Estates to 1707.

Members of Parliament

Parliaments of David II
1357 Alexander Gylyot
1357 Adam Tore
1357 Johnne Goldsmyth
1367 Adam of Bronhill
1367 Andro Bec

Parliaments of James I

Parliaments of James II
1439 William of Cranstoun
1440 Lancelate of Abirnethy
1440 Williame Bully
1445 Johnne of Dalrimpill
1449 William of Cranstoun
1450 Williame of Libertoune
1456 Willyame of Cranstoun
1457-8 Williame of Libertoune
1457-8 Johnne of Dalrimpill
1457-8 Alexander Napier
1457-8 George of Fawla
1462 William Cranstoun
1463 Sir Alexander Napier
1463 William Cranstoun of Swynhop
1463 Lancelot Abirnethy
1463-4 Sir Alexander Napier
1463-4 William Cranstoun of Swynhop
1464 George Girnelaw
1464 Lancelot Abirnethy
1466 George Pennycuke
1467 Thomas Olifant
1467 Thomas Fokert
1467-8 Thomas Fokert
1467-8 Johne of Fauside

1504–1707

See also
 List of constituencies in the Parliament of Scotland at the time of the Union

Constituencies disestablished in 1707
Burghs represented in the Parliament of Scotland (to 1707)
Politics of Edinburgh
History of Edinburgh